Içami Tiba (March 15, 1941 – August 2, 2015) was a Brazilian psychiatrist and writer. Tiba was known for writing his book Quem ama, Educa!. He was born in Tapiraí, Brazil.

Tiba died in São Paulo, Brazil, aged 74.

References

External links
Official page 

1941 births
2015 deaths
Brazilian psychiatrists
Brazilian people of Japanese descent
20th-century Brazilian physicians
20th-century Brazilian writers
21st-century Brazilian physicians
21st-century Brazilian writers